Michael T. Bowers (born 1939) is an American mass spectroscopist, a professor in the Department of Chemistry and Biochemistry at the University of California, Santa Barbara faculty.

Career
He studied at Gonzaga University, Spokane, Washington, earning his 1962 B.S. in 1962 and then earning a Ph.D. from the University of Illinois (with W.H. Flygare) in 1966.

He worked at the Jet Propulsion Laboratory in California for 2 years before joining UC Santa Barbara in 1968, where he was appointed full professor in 1976.

Bowers group uses mass spectrometry and ion mobility spectrometry to study gaseous species and determine their structure, reaction dynamics and mechanism.

Awards 
 Fellow of the American Chemical Society (ACS)
 1987 Elected Fellow of the American Physical Society "for outstanding contributions both theoretically and experimentally on the Mechanism and Dynamics of Ion-Molecule Reactions"  
 1994 Guggenheim Fellowship
 1994 Fellow of the American Association for the Advancement of Science
 1996 Frank H. Field and Joe L. Franklin Award of the American Chemical Society
 1997 Thomson Medal of the International Mass Spectrometry Foundation
 2004 Distinguished Contribution in Mass Spectrometry Award

See also
Gas phase ion chemistry

References

External links
Bowers Group Page
Vita

1939 births
Living people
Gonzaga University alumni
University of Illinois alumni
21st-century American chemists
Mass spectrometrists
University of California, Santa Barbara faculty
Fellows of the American Chemical Society
Fellows of the American Physical Society
Thomson Medal recipients
Fellows of the American Association for the Advancement of Science